Qara Qayeh (also Romanized as Qarā Qayeh and Qaraqīyeh; also known as Ghara Ghayeh, Qarah Qīyeh, and Qareh Qayeh) is a village in Darjazin-e Olya Rural District, Qorveh-e Darjazin District, Razan County, Hamadan Province, Iran. At the 2006 census, its population was 286, in 62 families.

References 

Populated places in Razan County